The gumbe or bench drum is a frame drum found in French Guiana, Jamaica and Sierra Leone. It has a small size, with square frame and one head of goat skin.

The gumbe was introduced in Sierra Leone in 1800 by Jamaican Maroon settlers. The ceremonial maroon music played with the gumbe gradually became a popular Creole music genre in Sierra Leone. It became known as Gumbe music and dance (named after the drum) and still exist nowadays. Somewhere it lost its specific association with Maroons and became identified with the broader Creole population of Sierra Leone.

Notes

References
 

Membranophones
French Guianan musical instruments